The 2022 AFC Futsal Asian Cup qualification was the qualification process organized by the Asian Football Confederation (AFC) to determine the participating teams for the 2022 AFC Futsal Asian Cup, the 17th edition of the international men's futsal championship of Asia.

A total of 15 teams qualified to play in the final tournament, excluding Kuwait - who automatically qualified as a host.

The qualification process was divided into four zones: ASEAN Zone, where the 2022 AFF Futsal Championship served as the qualifying competition, Central & South Zone, East Zone, and West Zone.

Qualification process
Of the 47 AFC member associations, a total of 31 teams entered the competition. Sixteen spots in the final tournament were distributed as follows:
Host: 1 spot (Kuwait)
West Zone: 5 spots
Central & South Zone: 4 spots
East Zone: 3 spots
ASEAN Zone: 3 spots

Draw

 In the West Zone, seven teams were drawn into one group of four teams and another group of three teams.

In the Central & South Zone, eight teams were drawn into two groups.

 In the East Zone, six teams were drawn into two group of three teams. Later, after China withdrew, the qualification was played as one group instead.

 Three berths from the ASEAN Zone were determined by 2022 AFF Futsal Championship where a separate draw was conducted by the ASEAN Football Federation on February 21.

Notes
Teams in bold qualified for the final tournament.

Format
The qualifiers took place between April 1 to 15 in centralized venues. In the West Zone, the United Arab Emirates were the hosts. Top two teams from each group and the winner of the play-off match between the third placed teams qualified. In the Central and South Zone, the matches were played in the Kyrgyz Republic where top two teams from each group advanced to the final tournament. The host for the East Zone were Malaysia. The top three teams from the five team group qualified for the tournament. The 2022 AFF Futsal Championship acts as the qualifiers for the ASEAN Zone, in which the top three teams (e.g. the two finalists and the winners of the third-place playoff) qualified.

West Zone
Top two teams of each group, and the winner of the play-off between the group third-placed team, qualified for 2022 AFC Futsal Asian Cup.
The matches were played between 5 and 9 April 2022.
All matches were played in United Arab Emirates.
Times listed are UTC+4.

Group A
<onlyinclude>

Group B

Play-off
The winner qualified for 2022 AFC Futsal Asian Cup.

Central and South Zone
Top two teams of each group qualified for 2022 AFC Futsal Asian Cup.
The matches were played between 10 and 12 April 2022.
All matches were played in Kyrgyzstan.
Times are listed are UTC+6.

Group A

Group B

East Zone
The top three teams qualified for 2022 AFC Futsal Asian Cup. China withdrew from the tournament on 20 April 2022 due to the surge in COVID-19 cases in the country following the 2022 Shanghai COVID-19 outbreak. Before they withdrew, the qualification was to be staged between six teams which were drawn into two groups of three teams, with the group winners and a play-off winner between the group runner-ups to qualify for the final tournament.

The matches were played between 17 and 21 May 2022.
All matches were played in Malaysia.
Times listed are UTC+8.

ASEAN Zone

Top three teams of the 2022 AFF Futsal Championship qualified for 2022 AFC Futsal Asian Cup.
The matches were played between 2 and 10 April 2022.
All matches were held in Thailand.
Times listed are UTC+7.

Group A

Group B

Semi-finals
The winners qualified for 2022 AFC Futsal Asian Cup.

Third place match
The winner qualified for 2022 AFC Futsal Asian Cup.

Final

Qualified teams
The following 16 teams qualified for the final tournament.

1 Bold indicates champions for that year. Italic indicates hosts for that year.

Goalscorers

References

Qualification
2022
qualification
April 2022 sports events in Asia
May 2022 sports events in Asia